The Wanderer and His Shadow is the second full-length album from Norwegian extreme metal band, Pantheon I and was released in May 2007.

The name of the album comes from one of Friedrich Nietzsche's earlier works of the same name.

Track listing
 "Origin of Sin" – 4:47
 "The Wanderer and His Shadow" – 4:54
 "Cyanide Storm" – 5:03
 "Coming to an End" – 6:27
 "Shedim"– 4:25
 "Where Angels Burn" – 5:16
 "My Curse" – 8:13
 "Chaos Incarnate" – 3:13

Credits
Andrè Kvebek – vocals, guitar
John Espen Sagstad – guitar
Mads Guldbekkhei – drums
Tor Risdal Stavenes – bass
Live Julianne Kostøl – cello
Guest appearances on Coming to an End by Solefald vocalist Lazare Nedland and Nachtgarm from Negator on Chaos Incarnate.
Violin on Where Angels Burn by former Pantheon I member Gunhild.
Cover art by Kjell Åge Meland, who did the front cover to Atrocity Divine.

Sources
 Metal Archives
 Pantheon I official website

2007 albums
Pantheon I albums